Volodymyr Antonyuk (born 10 May 1979) is a Ukrainian Paralympic footballer who won a gold medal at the 2008 Summer Paralympics in China.

References

External links
 

1979 births
Living people
Paralympic 7-a-side football players of Ukraine
Paralympic gold medalists for Ukraine
Paralympic silver medalists for Ukraine
Paralympic medalists in football 7-a-side
7-a-side footballers at the 2004 Summer Paralympics
7-a-side footballers at the 2008 Summer Paralympics
7-a-side footballers at the 2012 Summer Paralympics
7-a-side footballers at the 2016 Summer Paralympics
Medalists at the 2004 Summer Paralympics
Medalists at the 2008 Summer Paralympics
Medalists at the 2012 Summer Paralympics
Medalists at the 2016 Summer Paralympics
21st-century Ukrainian people